Embelin (2,5-dihydroxy-3-undecyl-1,4-benzoquinone) is a naturally occurring para-benzoquinone isolated from dried berries of Embelia ribes plants. Embelin has a wide spectrum of biological activities, including antioxidant, antitumor, anti-inflammatory, analgesic, anthelmintic, antifertility and antimicrobial.  Several studies have reported antidiabetic activity of embelin  Embelin treatment significantly decreased paraquat‐induced lung injury through suppressing oxidative stress, inflammatory cascade (inflammatory cytokines release), and MAPK/NF‐κB signaling pathway in paraquat‐intoxicated rats Embelin and embelin derivatives selectively inhibits 5-LOX and microsomal prostaglandin E2 synthase-1

References 

Antioxidants
Anti-aging substances
Benzoquinones